Nikki Flores (born Brandi Nichole Flores; October 17, 1988) is an American independent pop singer, musician, songwriter, and record producer.

Career

Recording artist
Nikki Flores began writing songs and performing at eight years old. Her parents, who are both musicians, built a home studio allowing her to perform. Flores was signed to Epic Records in 2005, at age 16. She recorded two unreleased albums, including This Girl, which featured "Strike", written and produced by Ryan Tedder; she was released from the label in 2009.

At this time Flores collaborated with producer Brian Kennedy for a song entitled "Let It Slide". She uploaded a demo version of "Let It Slide" to her Myspace page and it received over 19 million views and reached  1 on the Myspace Top 100 charts. She is proud of this song because of how relatable it is to her audience. "I was only writing about something that was so true for me in my life at that time. I released it on a whim and the response I got was overwhelming," she said.

In 2010, Flores signed onto Ryan Tedder's Patriot Records, administered by Universal Republic. Tedder and Flores parted ways when the label was dissolved in 2012, and she turned her attention to writing with and for other artists.

Songwriting career
In 2012, Flores co-wrote and was featured on "Roses" by Nas which was a deluxe edition bonus track on Life is Good.

She contributed lyrics and melodies to "Coolin" on Mýa's Smoove Jones; "Empty Words" on Christina Aguilera's Lotus; and "One Bad Night", "Palace", and "Sleepover" for Hayley Kiyoko. She had multiple collaborations with JoJo, including "Mad Love" on Mad Love, 2017's "Wonder Woman" and "Save My Soul" from EP III, which was praised by media outlets such as Billboard, Rap Up and Idolator.

Flores is also known in Asia, writing the song "Golden Touch" for Namie Amuro's Genic which was a No. 1 album in Japan. She wrote "Rush" and "Gold" for Riri, and "Whatta Man" for I.O.I, which peaked at No. 2 on the Gaon Digital Chart on August 7–13, 2016, with 128,760 downloads sold and 2,752,097 streams. Flores has written for YG recording artists in South Korea.

XII XV EP
In 2015, Flores enlisted the help of producer/musician Blake Stranathan, long time collaborators The Family (Linnea Deb, Joy Deb, Anton Malmberg Hård af Segerstad), and producers Glashaus to build her first release. The project was emotionally centered around ending a six-year relationship and the phases of finding herself in the aftermath. Her website noted influences of Frank Ocean, Mariah Carey, Aaliyah and Kanye West.

In 2016, Flores digitally released two promotional singles, "Canary" (September 9) and "How to Love Her" (October 28), along with music videos shot and directed by Topshelf Junior (Jhene Aiko, Kehlani). On December 8, Flores released XII XV, a six-song EP which peaked at No. 20 on the US iTunes pop charts the week of its release.

Discography

Miscellaneous

Filmography
2007 – Super Sweet 16: The Movie
2007 – Yo Gabba Gabba! 
2016 – Dancey Dance

References

1988 births
Living people
21st-century American women singers
American musicians of Mexican descent
American women pop singers
American pop pianists
American women singer-songwriters
American women pianists
Musicians from Los Angeles
Singer-songwriters from California
21st-century American pianists
Hispanic and Latino American musicians
21st-century American singers